Bullshot may mean:

 Bullshot (cocktail), a variation of the Bloody Mary
 Bullshot (video games), a portmanteau of bullshit and screenshot referring to the misrepresentation of a final product's technical or artistic quality by artificially enhancing promotional images or video footage
 Bullshot Crummond, a 1974 parody stage play of the British pulp hero Bulldog Drummond
 Bullshot (film), a 1983 film based on the play
Bullshot, a 1979 album by rock and roll guitarist Link Wray